James Harry Michael Jr. (October 17, 1918 – August 29, 2005) was a United States district judge of the United States District Court for the Western District of Virginia.

Education and career

Born in Charlottesville, Virginia, Michael received a Bachelor of Science degree from the University of Virginia in 1940 and a Bachelor of Laws from the University of Virginia School of Law in 1942. He was in the United States Navy as a Lieutenant during World War II, from 1942 to 1946. He was in private practice in Charlottesville from 1946 to 1980. He was a United States Naval Reserve Commander from 1948 to 1969. He was a lecturer at the University of Virginia from 1948 to 1953. He was a judge of the Charlottesville Juvenile and Domestic Relations Court from 1954 to 1967. He was a Special Master in Patent Cases for the United States District Court for the Western District of Virginia from 1960 to 1970. He was a member of the Virginia Senate from 1968 to 1980. Michael was the Democratic nominee for lieutenant governor in 1973 but lost to Republican John N. Dalton.

Federal judicial service

Michael was nominated by President Jimmy Carter on April 9, 1980, to the United States District Court for the Western District of Virginia, to a new seat created by 92 Stat. 1629. He was confirmed by the United States Senate on September 29, 1980, and received his commission the next day. He assumed senior status on October 31, 1995. Michael served in that capacity until his death on August 29, 2005, in Charlottesville. Michael's papers are held at the Albert and Shirley Small Special Collections Library at the University of Virginia.

References

Sources
 

1918 births
2005 deaths
Judges of the United States District Court for the Western District of Virginia
United States district court judges appointed by Jimmy Carter
20th-century American judges
United States Navy officers
University of Virginia alumni
University of Virginia School of Law alumni
United States Navy reservists
University of Virginia faculty
Virginia state senators